Saint Paul's Battery, also known as Ta' Lombardi Battery, is an artillery battery in Marsaxlokk, Malta. It stands on high ground at the shoreward end of Delimara Point, above il-Ħofra-z-Zgħira. It is a polygonal fort and was built by the British from 1881 to 1886. It commands a field of fire northwards over St Thomas' Bay and Marsaskala.

History
St Paul's Battery was built between 1881 and 1886 by the British to help Fort Tas-Silġ cover the defence of St Thomas Bay. The battery has a D-shape, with three gun emplacements for RML 7 inch gun, which were mounted on six-foot platforms. Its gun crew and garrison were stationed at Fort Tas-Silġ.

The battery's guns were removed and it was abandoned 1900 since it had lost its importance as a defensive position.

Present day

The battery remains abandoned to this day and in very poor condition. It is covered with trees and shrubs and its ditch is filled with debris, but the gun emplacements, ditch and entrance to its underground magazine are still visible.

In 2015, the battery was shortlisted as a possible site for the campus of the proposed American University of Malta. It was not chosen, and the campus is to be split up between Dock No. 1 in Cospicua and Żonqor Point in Marsaskala.

References

Polygonal forts in Malta
Marsaxlokk
British fortifications in Malta
Batteries in Malta
Buildings and structures completed in 1886
Limestone buildings in Malta
Military installations closed in 1900
19th-century fortifications
Military installations established in 1886